Nicolas Šumský (born 13 November 1993) is a Czech professional footballer who currently plays as a midfielder for SK Vysoké Mýto.

Career
Šumský played for the youth teams of clubs including Monaco, Cannes, River Plate and Argentinos Juniors. He subsequently played for Bohemians 1905, Parma and Gorica before heading to Vysoké Mýto of the Czech Fourth Division in January 2014.

Following a period with Slovak side Dukla Banská Bystrica, Šumský joined Scottish side Hamilton Academical on a one-year contract in February 2015. In July 2015, he was loaned out to Scottish League One side Airdrieonians. Following the end of his loan period, Šumský was released by Hamilton in January 2016.

Šumský returned to the Czech Republic in February 2016, signing for Dukla Prague and heading immediately to their farm team in the third tier of Czech football, SK Benešov.

References

External links

1993 births
Sportspeople from Hradec Králové
Living people
Czech footballers
Czech expatriate footballers
Association football midfielders
AS Monaco FC players
AS Cannes players
Club Atlético River Plate footballers
Argentinos Juniors footballers
Bohemians 1905 players
Parma Calcio 1913 players
FK Dukla Banská Bystrica players
Hamilton Academical F.C. players
Airdrieonians F.C. players
SK Benešov players
FC Vysočina Jihlava players
FK Frýdek-Místek players
ŠKF Sereď players
Czech First League players
Czech National Football League players
Slovak Super Liga players
Scottish Professional Football League players
Moravian-Silesian Football League players
Czech expatriate sportspeople in France
Expatriate footballers in France
Czech expatriate sportspeople in Argentina
Expatriate footballers in Argentina
Czech expatriate sportspeople in Italy
Expatriate footballers in Italy
Czech expatriate sportspeople in Slovenia
Expatriate footballers in Slovenia
Czech expatriate sportspeople in Slovakia
Expatriate footballers in Slovakia
Czech expatriate sportspeople in Scotland
Expatriate footballers in Scotland